Nisan-years is an ancient calendar system used around Mesopotamia. Its beginning was from the prehistorical era. Ever since Mesopotamia had historical writings, even before the First Babylonian dynasty of Hammurabi, its calendar used the Nisan-years.

Nisan-years is a lunisolar calendar system, in which the lunar years and the solar years are synchronized by adding in an intercalary month in seven of nineteen years (called the Metonic cycle). Since a tropical year is 365.2422 days, and a synodic month is averaged 29.53059 days, in nineteen years the solar and the lunar calendars will only differ by about two hours, or 1 part in 80,000.

Nisan-years begin in the Spring season. Technically, its New Year's Day is the day after the New Moon closest to (within fifteen days before or after) the Spring equinox, when the day and the night is of equal length, set at March 21 in the Gregorian Calendar). It begins the first month, named Nisanu/Nisan/Abib.

Israel
Nisan-years is often called the Jewish religious calendar, in contrast to Tishri-years, which is often called the Jewish civil calendar. The month of Nisan is important since it begins the Spring Feasts of Israel.

The way to determine whether or not an intercalary month should be added was by agricultural observation in Israel. If by the end of a Nisan-year barley did not grow spikes a month was added so that barley can be harvested in the month of Nisan.

Jewish tradition fixed Nisan 16, the second day after Passover (Nisan 15), as the wave offering or omer offering in Israel, when a portion of the harvested barley is dedicated to God as a Thanksgiving. The Torah, however, fixed it on the first day after the Shabbat (Leviticus 23:9-14).

Calendar

The observation of the New Moon may be influenced by the weather condition, so the Rosh Chodesh may be delayed for one or two days. But over all the errors cancel each other, and the calendar system remains accurate.

The intercalary month could be a second Sixth Month (Ululu II), as often practiced in Mesopotamia, or a second Twelfth Month (Adar II, Adar Sheni, or ve-Adar) as consistently practices in Israel.

See also
 Babylonian calendar
 Small Mahzor

References 

Lunisolar calendars
Ancient Mesopotamia
Jewish holy days
Hebrew calendar